Momba District is a district of Songwe Region, Tanzania. It was formed from the western part of Mbozi District when Songwe Region was created from Mbeya Region.

References

Districts of Songwe Region